Florencja may refer to the following places:
Florencja, Kuyavian-Pomeranian Voivodeship (north-central Poland)
Florencja, Radom County in Masovian Voivodeship (east-central Poland)
Florencja, Sierpc County in Masovian Voivodeship (east-central Poland)